Desai (Marathi, Hindi: देसाई) is an Indian administrative, princely or honorary title and surname.

Etymology 
The word is derived from the Sanskrit deśa (country) and  svāmī (lord).

Desai as a title
Desai was a title given to feudal lords, and others who were granted a village or group of villages in Maharashtra, and North Karnataka. The title Desai should not be associated with a particular religion or caste, though a Desai would use the title of Rao or Rai or Raje as a suffix to his name denoting he is a king of those villages, The "Desai" title was given by Maratha emperors, Mughal emperors and by the Deccan sultanates.

 In Maharashtra, the title Desai is conferred to feudal lords and village council members. Most of them are either Gaud Saraswat Brahmins, Deshastha Brahmins, Karhade Brahmins and Marathas.

 Desais were the rulers of Kudal (Sindhudurg) in Maharashtra.

 Desai, or a loftier compound, was a rare title for rulers of a few princely states, notably - Raja Sar Desai in the Maratha Savantvadi State from 1627 until the adoption of "Raja Bahadur" in 1763.

Desai Shri in Patdi (the former Viramgam State), in Eastern Kathiawar, where Desai was also the name of the ruling family, which belongs to the Desai clan of Kadwa Patidar.

In Gujarat, Desai is honoured to Anavil Brahmin, Khedaval Brahimins, Vaishnav Vanik and Patidars caste people. The title was also given to feudal lords and revenue collectors

Desai as a surname
Desai as a surname is used by Gaud Saraswat Brahmin, Deshastha Brahmin, Karhade Brahmin, Marathas, Anavil Brahmin, Khedaval Brahmin,  Rabari, Leva Patel, Patidar, Bania and Lingayat communities of Maharashtra, Gujarat and Karnataka.

Individual people 
Notable individuals with the surname Desai include:
 Public officers
 Gopaldas Ambaidas Desai – politician; former Prince of Dhasa
Babubhai Desai - Ex MLA of kankrej
 Kantilal Thakoredas Desai – second Chief Justice of Gujarat
 Kevit Desai - Permanent Secretary, Ministry of Education state department for Vocational and Technical Training, Kenya
 Krishna Desai – CPI politician
 Morarji Desai – Prime Minister of India (1977–79)
 Mahadev Desai – Secretary to Mahatma Gandhi
 S. T. Desai – first Chief Justice of Gujarat
 Haridas Viharidas Desai - Diwan of Junagadh state (1883–95)
 Bhimsen Venkatrao Desai - Politician; Member of the 7th and 8th Lok Sabha representing the Raichur constituency of Karnataka
 Shamburaj Shivajirao Desai- State Minister Of Home Affairs, Maharashtra, Currently Serving His 4th Term As MLA in Maharashtra Assembly
Arts, sciences and business
Anita Desai – Author; mother of author Kiran Desai
Bhairavi Desai – American labor union leader
Bindu Desai – Actress
C. D. Desai – Banker and philatelist
Ebrahim Desai – Islamic scholar
Kiran Desai – Author; 2006 Man Booker Prize winner
Kishwar Desai – Author
Manmohan Desai – Director
Mavjibhai Desai – Vice Chairman of Banas Dairy
Meghnad Desai, Baron Desai – economist
Mihir A. Desai - American economist and professor at Harvard Business School and Harvard Law School
Nitin Chandrakant Desai – Art director
Padma Desai – American economist and professor at Columbia University
Ramanlal Desai - Gujarati writer
Ranjit Desai – Marathi writer
Salil Desai – Author
Sapan Desai – American physician; publisher and discredited researcher
Umedram Lalbhai Desai – Physician

 Culture & Sports
Anoop Desai – American singer
Gunwant Desai – Indian cricketer 
K. R. Desai - Cricketer; philanthropist; educator
Prachi Desai – Actress
Ramakant Desai – Cricketer; India's first fast bowler
Rashami Desai – Actress
Ravish Desai – Actor
Renu Desai – Actress
Satyaki "Sattu" Desai – Environmental officer
Sean Desai - American football coach; Defensive Coordinator for the Chicago Bears
Subhash Desai – Shiv Sena leader
Tina Desai – Actress
Rajdeep Sardesai - News Anchor

See also 
 Maratha titles
 Indian honorifics
 Indian feudalism

References 

Indian feudalism
Indian surnames
Hindu surnames
Gujarati-language surnames